Podskarbice Szlacheckie  is a village in the administrative district of Gmina Regnów, within Rawa County, Łódź Voivodeship, in central Poland.

References

Podskarbice Szlacheckie